Lürschau is a municipality in the district of Schleswig-Flensburg, in Schleswig-Holstein, Germany.

In 1043 a heath at Lürschau was the site of a battle between a Danish-Norwegian army under king Magnus the Good and a Wendish army returning from looting in Jutland. The Wends were defeated with heavy loss of life.

References

Municipalities in Schleswig-Holstein
Schleswig-Flensburg